Andriamangarira was a king from the Merina Kingdom in Madagascar.  He founded the royal city of Antsahadinta in around 1725. He was the grandson of King Andriamasinavalona, son of Rasohanamanjaka of Ambohimahamanina, one of his daughters, with a certain Andriandambozozoro, Lord of Ivatobe avaratra and Malaza in Ambodirano Imerinatsimo.
The tomb of Andriamangarira, qualified as a « Pirogue grave », and his « Tranomasina » (Sacred House) according to traditions, are still visible in Antsahadinta.

After he died in 1775, his second son Andriambolamena succeeded him to the throne of Antsahadinta. Their descendants constitute the clan of Zanamangarira, « Zanak'Andriamasinavalona » of origin, and their territories extend into Ankibonimerina from Miadanimerina avaratra, Ambatomahabodo and Finaritra; to Vakinankaratra in Isoavina, Antetezambato, Tsarafaritra, Ambatoharanana, Miadanimerina atsimo, Antamika and Ankotsaka. The whole of the territories is called Anjanamangarira.

Origin of Andriamangarira 

This history is about events from the days of the reign of Andriamasinavalona (1675-1710) in Ankibonimerina. Being the second son of King Andriantsimitoviaminandriandehibe (1650 -1670), he had many siblings. His sister named Ravololondrenitrimo from Ambohimiakoja was the mother of:

 Andriandambozozoro of Malaza and Ivatobe avaratra; 
 Andrianjakatrimo of Ivatobe atsimo;
 Razafindrahety (daughter) of Tangaina, in Ambodirano-Imerinatsimo.

According to tradition and history, Andriandambozozoro, Lord of Ivatobe, Androhibe and Ambohitrontsy married one of the daughters of Andriamasinavalona, King of Imerina.

a) Rasohanamanjaka of Ambohimahamanina, daughter of Andriamasinavalona, was the mother of:

 Andriamangarira who founded and reigned in Antsahadinta for 50 years (1725-1775);
 Andriamalama of Isoanangano;
 Ranosy (daughter) of Androhibe;
 Rabiby of Antalaho / Antanetibe;
 Andriamifonozozoro (Rafonozozoro, as Father Callet described) of Ivatobe.

b) Rangorinimerina of Ambohitrontsy, with Andriamifonozozoro, was the mother of:

 Andriamohara, King of Alasora;
 Rakotomavo or Andriambelomasina, King of Ambohimanga (1730-1770);
 Andriantoarano of Alasora;
 Ramisamanjaka of Anosiarivo;
 Andriampalimanana of Tsirangaina;
 Rahisatra and Rahira (daughters) of Manandona, Randrianizara (daughter) married Andriamborosinandriana of Ambohipoloalina and gave birth to Andrianarabo, Andriantsoanandriana and Andriankotonavalona.

Andriamangarira married Ratoeboahangy and together they had 3 children:

 Ramakilahy of Ankadinanahary;
 Andriambolamena, his successor, King of Antsahadinta for 28 years (1775-1803);
 Rahanivofotsimanjaka, who married Rabibilahy of Ambohimahamanina.

The clan of Zanamangarira 

Andriambolamena was the second son of King Andriamangarira. Andrianampoinimerina, King of Avaradrano (Ambohimanga) and later King of United Imerina, extended his Kingdom and defeated Andrianamboatsimarofy, the last King of Imerinatsimo (Antananarivo), then defeated his successor Ramaromanompo in Anosizato and Antsahadinta. Andrianampoinimerina took the Kingdom of Antananarivo along with the fiefdom of Antsahadinta.

Andriambolamena and his family left Antsahadinta, after 28 years of reign, and founded a village not far from Antsahadinta, called Ambohitsoa; he died and he was buried there. He had many children but was succeeded as head of the clan by his son, Ramboabe Andrianjakapingarivo. 
He did not stay in Ambohitsoa but he founded a new village called Ampahatelo. Later, he left Ampahatelo and moved southward to a place next to Miantsoarivo (nearby Behenjy) and founded another village called Itsarahavana.

Ramboabe Andrianjakapingarivo had many children but those remembered in history are:
 Andriamontandraisoa: his eldest son, in Ampahatelo, he changed the name of the village to Miadanimerina; his descendants founded villages like Ambatomahabodo and Soaray. His son: Rainizakamanga lived in Finaritra;
 Andriampakatro: his youngest son, in Ankatsaka, settled in  Isoavina-Ambohimandroso and his descendants are still there.

Their descendants constitute the Zanamangarira clan and they named their territories Anjanamangarira I (Ankibonimerina) and Anjanamangarira II (Vakinankaratra).

References 

Merina people
Malagasy monarchs
1695 births
1775 deaths